Alexandr Gerlits (born 31 July 1989) is a Kazakhstani cross-country skier and biathlete who competed at the 2018 and 2022 Winter Paralympics.

Career
Gerlits represented Kazakhstan at the 2018 Winter Paralympics where he finished in fourth place in the 20 kilometre free, sixth place in the 12.5 kilometres, and seventh place in the 7.5 kilometres event. 

He again competed at the 2022 Winter Paralympics and won a bronze medal in the 10 kilometres standing event with a time of 33:06.5. This was Kazakhstan's first medal of the 2022 Winter Games.

References 

Living people
1989 births
Biathletes at the 2018 Winter Paralympics
Biathletes at the 2022 Winter Paralympics
Cross-country skiers at the 2018 Winter Paralympics
Cross-country skiers at the 2022 Winter Paralympics
Medalists at the 2022 Winter Paralympics
Paralympic bronze medalists for Kazakhstan
Paralympic medalists in biathlon
Paralympic biathletes of Kazakhstan
21st-century Kazakhstani people